Sympistis fifia is a species of moth in the family Noctuidae (the owlet moths).

The MONA or Hodges number for Sympistis fifia is 10066.

References

Further reading

 
 
 

fifia
Articles created by Qbugbot
Moths described in 1904